Phase Genomics is an American biotechnology company based in Seattle, Washington. The company develops proximity ligation kits and Hi-C sequencing technology used to analyze chromosomes. Phase Genomics sells proximity ligation kits, scientific services, and computational analyses.

History 
The company was founded by Ivan Liachko and Shawn Sullivan in 2015. It was originally housed in the CoMotion biotech incubator at University of Washington before relocating to a separate facility. It develops proximity ligation kits and Hi-C sequencing technology used to analyze chromosomes. The company sells proximity ligation kits, scientific services, and computational analyses.

Research 
Phase Genomics developed a library preparation kit for the Hi-C sequencing method previously developed by researchers Job Dekker and Eric Lander. The kits are used to study the architecture of genomes. In 2018, Phase Genomics received a $1.5 million SBIR grant from the National Institute of Allergy and Infectious Diseases (NIAID) to research antimicrobial resistance using Hi-C technology. In January 2020, it was awarded an additional $1.5 million from NIAID for phase 2 SBIR funding. In 2019, Phase Genomics received $200,000 from the Bill & Melinda Gates Foundation to improve computational methods of extracting genomic data in microbiome samples. Later in 2019, the company was awarded $325,000 from the U.S. Department of Energy to research algae biofuels using proximity litigation technology for metagenome assembly. In 2020, Phase Genomics received 2 grants totaling $3.9 million from the National Human Genome Research Institute and the Eunice Kennedy Shriver National Institute of Child Health and Human Development. The 3-year grants fund research on chromosomal abnormalities causing cancer, infertility, and reproductive issues.

In June 2021, the company released a platform for discovering new viruses in microbiome samples.

References

External links
 

Biotechnology companies established in 2015
Genomics companies
2015 establishments in Washington (state)
Companies based in Seattle
Biotechnology companies of the United States